Shahini may refer to:
Anjeza Shahini (b. 1987), Albanian singer
Shahini, Iran (disambiguation), places in Iran